The Department of Public Enterprises (DPE) is one of the ministries of the South African government. It is the government's shareholder representative with oversight responsibility for a number of state-owned enterprises (SoEs).

Enterprises
It is estimated that South Africa has about 300 SoEs, nine of which fall under the responsibility of the DPE;

 Alexkor – Mining sector (diamond mining)
 Denel – Aerospace and Defence sector (armaments manufacturer)
 Eskom – Energy sector (national electricity utility)
 South African Express – Transport sector (regional and feeder airline)
 South African Forestry Company – Forestry sector (manages forestry on state owned-land)
 Transnet – Transport and related infrastructure sector (railways, harbours, oil/fuel pipelines and terminals)

Other corporate entities not under the Department of Public Enterprises include the South African Post Office, the South African Broadcasting Corporation, the South African Bureau of Standards, the Council for Scientific and Industrial Research and Sentech. Various other smaller state-owned companies exist in South Africa.

See also

 Public Investment Corporation

References

External links
Ministry of Public Enterprises

Public Enterprises